Jay Arnote is an American college basketball coach. He was the head coach at Grand Canyon University from 1981 to 1983 and at Northern Arizona University from 1983 to 1988.

References

Living people
American men's basketball players
Arizona State Sun Devils men's basketball players
American men's basketball coaches
Grand Canyon Antelopes men's basketball coaches
Northern Arizona Lumberjacks men's basketball coaches
Year of birth missing (living people)